Gliese 1 is a red dwarf in the constellation Sculptor, which is found in the southern celestial hemisphere. It is one of the closest stars to the Sun, at a distance of 14.2 light years. Because of its proximity to the Earth it is a frequent object of study and much is known about its physical properties and composition. However, with an apparent magnitude of about 8.6 it is too faint to be seen with the naked eye.

History
This star's high proper motion was first documented by Benjamin Gould in 1885. At that time the star was identified as Cordoba Z.C. 23h 1584.
As it lies very close to the origin of the astronomical right ascension coordinates during the 1950 epoch, it became the first star in both the Gliese Catalogue of Nearby Stars and the Luyten Half-Second star catalogues.

Properties
The stellar classification of this star has been rated from M1.5V to M4.0V by various sources. Gliese 1 is estimated to have 33% of the Sun's mass and 33% of the Sun's radius.

This star is suspected of being a BY Draconis-type variable star with the provisional variable star designation NSV 15017. It is also suspected of being a flare star.  Like other flare stars, it emits X-rays. The temperatures of the layers of the atmosphere of this star have been measured.

This star has been examined for an orbiting companion using speckle interferometry in the near infrared part of the spectrum. However, no companion was found to a magnitude limit of 10.5 at 1 AU from the primary, out to a magnitude limit of 12.5 at 10 AU. Radial velocity measurements have likewise failed to reveal the presence of a companion orbiting this star. This search excludes a planet with a few Earth masses orbiting in the habitable zone, or a Jupiter-mass planet orbiting at a radius of 1 AU or less. The radial velocity shows little or no variability, with a measurement precision of less than 20 m/s.

The space velocity components of this star are U = +77.2, V = -99.5 and W = . It is orbiting through the Milky Way galaxy with an orbital eccentricity of 0.45, and a distance from the galactic core that varies from 3,510 to 9,150 parsecs. By comparison, the Sun is currently 8,500 parsecs from the core. Stars with high peculiar velocities are termed runaway stars.

References

0001
High-proper-motion stars
000439
225213
CD-37 15492
Local Bubble
Sculptor (constellation)
M-type main-sequence stars
?
TIC objects
BY Draconis variables
Flare stars
Suspected variables